Honcho or Honchō can refer to:

Places 

 Itabashi-honchō Station, a metro station on the Toei Mita Line in Itabashi, Tokyo, Japan
 Yoshiwara-honchō Station, a train station on the Gakunan Railway Line in Fuji, Shizuoka Prefecture, Japan
 Hiyoshi-Honchō Station, a metro station in Japan
 Nihonbashi-Honcho, a neighborhood in the Nihonbashi area, Chūō ward, Tokyo, Japan

Literature 
 Honcho (comics), a fictional character in the Marvel Universe
 Honchō Monzui, a Japanese book of Chinese prose and poetry
 Honchō Seiki, a Japanese historical text
 Honchō Tsugan, a Japanese historical text from 1670

Other 
 Delta Sailplane Honcho, an American glider
Jeep Honcho, an American vehicle
 Honcho (rapper), a Filipino rapper formerly known as Bosx1ne, a member of the Filipino hip-hop collective Ex Battalion
 Honcho - gay pornographic magazine published by Modernismo Publications from April 1978 to November 2009